Joan of Arc is an 1879 painting by Jules Bastien-Lepage, that belongs to the Metropolitan Museum of Art in which it was also exhibited at the Exposition Universelle in Paris. 

French national hero Joan of Arc became an increasingly important figure in French sculpture, painting and culture in the 1870s  and 1880s, following the country's defeat in the Franco-Prussian War, after which the German Empire annexed a part of Joan's (and Bastien-Lepage's) birthplace of Lorraine. Bastien-Lepage was no exception and his work was bought by the New York businessman Erwin Davis in 1880, having been exhibited at the Paris Salon earlier that year.

References

1879 paintings
Paintings by Jules Bastien-Lepage
Paintings in the collection of the Metropolitan Museum of Art
Cultural depictions of Joan of Arc